Eric Clifton Iles (born 11 September 1927) is a former Australian politician.

He was born in Sorell, Tasmania. In 1966 he was elected to the Tasmanian House of Assembly as a Liberal member for Franklin in a recount following the resignation of Thomas Pearsall. He was defeated at the next election in 1969.

References

1927 births
Living people
Liberal Party of Australia members of the Parliament of Tasmania
Members of the Tasmanian House of Assembly